Sparr refers to:

Sparr, Florida, a town in the United States
Sparr, Michigan, an unincorporated community
Otto Christoph von Sparr (1599  or 1605-1668), Field Marshal of Brandenburg-Prussia
Lord Sparr, character in the book series The Secrets of Droon
Sparr, a type of Irish axe used by Galloglass

See also 
Sparre